WCEE may refer to:

WCEE-LD, a low-power television station (channel 17, virtual 16) licensed to serve Charlotte, North Carolina, United States
WPXS, formerly known as WCEE, an affiliate of RTV serving the St. Louis designated market area
WIFR, formerly known as WCEE, a CBS television affiliate based in Rockford, Illinois and licensed to nearby Freeport
WGRV-LP, formerly known as WCEE-LP, a smooth jazz radio station in Melbourne, Florida